Fletcher, Jennings & Co.  was an engineering company at Lowca near Whitehaven, Cumberland, England.

Overview

Fletcher and Jennings  took over the business of Tulk and Ley in 1857. From then, until 1884, the company concentrated on four and six-coupled industrial tank locomotives, although other goods such as bridge girders, and blast-furnace shells for the burgeoning local iron industry, were also produced. By then nearly two hundred locomotives had been built and the company acquired limited liability as Lowca Engineering Company Ltd.

In 1905, the name changed again to the New Lowca Engineering Company Ltd., but the company was receiving fewer orders. After a disastrous fire in 1912, all production ceased and the company being finally wound up in 1927.

Surviving locomotives
Preserved locomotives manufactured by the company include:

Other locomotives

Other locomotives manufactured by the company include:

Brigham Hall/Rothersyke of the Cleator & Workington junction railway

In fiction
The fictional locomotives Skarloey and Rheneas from The Railway Series and Thomas and Friends, were built by Fletcher, Jennings & Co. (being the twins of Talyllyn and Dolgoch, respectively) Captain Baxter also made an appearance in Railway Series book 18 Stepney the "Bluebell" Engine.

Captain Baxter appeared in the movie Muppets Most Wanted. However, he was modified to look like an old American locomotive and was renamed.

Sources

 Kyle, Ian "Steam from Lowca" (1974)
 Wear, Russell "Some further notes on the Lowca Works", Cumbrian Railways, Feb 2002
 

Locomotive manufacturers of the United Kingdom
Companies based in Cumbria
Fletcher, Jennings locomotives